Virginia v. Maryland, 540 U.S. 56 (2003), is a case in which the Supreme Court of the United States settled a dispute between the Commonwealth of Virginia and the State of Maryland regarding Virginia's riparian rights to the Potomac River. The Supreme Court held in a 7—2 decision that Maryland has no legal authority to regulate or prohibit Virginia and its political subdivisions from building and improving structures in the river and from drawing water from the river. The decision drew heavily on the Maryland–Virginia Compact of 1785, an agreement between the two states concerning navigational and riparian water rights along the Potomac River.

See also
 List of United States Supreme Court cases, volume 540
 List of United States Supreme Court cases
 Lists of United States Supreme Court cases by volume
 List of United States Supreme Court cases by the Rehnquist Court

References

External links

2003 in United States case law
Internal territorial disputes of the United States
United States Supreme Court cases
United States Supreme Court cases of the Rehnquist Court
United States Supreme Court original jurisdiction cases
2003 in Virginia
2003 in Maryland
United States Constitution Article One case law
Potomac River
Borders of Maryland
Borders of Virginia